A Date with Jimmy Smith Volume One is an album by American jazz organist Jimmy Smith featuring performances recorded in 1957 and released on the Blue Note label.

Reception
The Allmusic review by Scott Yanow awarded the album 3 stars out of 5.

Track listing

Side one

Side two

Recorded at Manhattan Towers in New York City on February 11 (tracks A1 & B1), and February 13 (track A2), 1957

Personnel

Musicians
 Jimmy Smith – organ
 Donald Byrd – trumpet, (tracks A1 & B1)
 Lou Donaldson – alto saxophone, (tracks A1 & B1)
 Hank Mobley – tenor saxophone, (tracks A1 & B1)
 Eddie McFadden – guitar
 Art Blakey – drums, (tracks A1 & B1)
 Donald Bailey – drums, (track A2)

Technical
 Alfred Lion – producer
 Rudy Van Gelder – engineer
 Reid Miles – cover design
 Francis Wolff – photography
 Ira Gitler – liner notes

References

Blue Note Records albums
Jimmy Smith (musician) albums
1957 albums
Albums produced by Alfred Lion